Encephalartos cycadifolius is a species of cycad that is native to the Winterberg mountains to the north of Bedford in the Eastern Cape province, South Africa. It is found at elevations from 1,200 to 1,800 meters.

Description
It is a cycad with a trunk at least partly underground, up to 1.5 m high and with a diameter of 25-30 cm, often with secondary stems originating from shoots that arise at the base of the main stem. 

The leaves, pinnate, 60–90 cm long, are arranged in a crown at the apex of the stem and are supported by a 10-20 cm long petiole, without thorns; each leaf is composed of numerous pairs of lanceolate leaflets, with an entire margin, of an average length of 9-12 cm, of olive-green color, inserted on the yellowish rachis.

It is a dioecious species with male specimens that have 1 or 2 cones, cylindrical-conical, 13–22 cm long and 5–7 cm broad, sessile, covered with a greyish tomentum, and female specimens with 1 or 2 cylindrical-ovoid cones, pedunculate, 20–30 cm long and 16–18 cm in diameter, greenish-yellow in color, also thickly tomentose, gray to brown in color.

The seeds are coarsely ovoid, 20–30 mm long, covered by a yellow-orange to amber color sarcotesta.

References

External links
 
 

cycadifolius
Plants described in 1834